Winthrop High School is a public four-year high school in Winthrop, Massachusetts, United States. It is a part of Winthrop Public Schools.

The building is shared with Winthrop Middle School. The first steel beams were put up in 2015 and opening was to occur in fall 2016. Note: Winthrop Middle School and Winthrop High School are housed in the same building, but are two separate and distinct schools with their own administration.

Notable alumni
 Paul Francis Anderson, American prelate of the Roman Catholic Church
 Patricia Brown, pitcher who played in the All-American Girls Professional Baseball League
 Mike Eruzione, 1980 USA Olympic hockey team gold medalist
 John B. Kennedy, American city manager and politician
 Harriet White Medin, American actress and dialogue coach
 Beatrice Roberts, American film actress 
 Larry Thomas, American professional baseball pitcher

References

External links

 

Public high schools in Massachusetts
Winthrop, Massachusetts